The Huaral Province is one of the nine provinces in the Lima Region of Peru. It was created by Law No. 21488 on May 11, 1976 by president Francisco Morales Bermúdez out of eight districts of the Canta Province and four of the Huaura Province. Geographically, its territory extends around the valley of the Chancay River from the mountainous frontier of the Pasco Region and Junín Region up to the Pacific Ocean.

Geography 
The Puwaq Hanka mountain range traverses the province. Some of the highest peaks of the province are listed below:

Political division
The province is divided into twelve districts (Spanish: distritos, singular: distrito):
 Huaral
 Atavillos Alto
 Atavillos Bajo
 Aucallama
 Chancay
 Ihuari
 27 de Noviembre
 Lampian
 Pacaraos
Santa Cruz de Andamarca
 Sumbilca
 San Miguel de Acos

Attractions
 Lomas de Lachay -  national reserve.
 Huando oranges were Huaral's most important products in the 20th century.
 Thermal baths of Collpa.

See also 
 Challwaqucha
 Willkaqucha
 Yanawayin Lake

External links
  Official website
 Fotos de Huaral
 La Plaza Centenario en GoogleEarth
 La Plaza de Armas en GoogleEarth
  Huaral en linea
  Huaral en la Web

Notes

Provinces of the Lima Region